Amanda Duffy may refer to:

Mandy Lee (singer), née Amanda Duffy
Amanda Duffy, Mrs. America
Amanda Duffy (soccer), managing director of operations for the National Women's Soccer League